The Gibraltar identity card is an official identity document issued by Civil Status and Registration Office of the Government of Gibraltar to all British citizens living in Gibraltar. Validity of the document is 10 years (5 years for children under 16).

The identity card serve as a valid travel document in to the United Kingdom, Ireland, Montserrat and Montenegro for holders who are British Citizens or British Overseas Territories Citizens connected to Gibraltar.

It also served as a valid travel document within the Schengen Area until the transition period ended after the United Kingdom withdrew form the EU. With the end of the transition period after Brexit 31 December 2020, the card is only accepted for entry to Schengen states if the holder resided, by 31 December 2020, in the particular state they seek to enter. In addition, Austria, Estonia, Hungary, Ireland, Lithuania, Norway, Portugal, Sweden and Switzerland accept the card if the holder resided in any Schengen country by 31 December 2020. The UK and Spain have reached an agreement in principle over Gibraltar's future relationship with the EU intending for Gibraltar to be included become part of the Schengen Area. Spain has asked the EU to accept Gibraltar ID card during the period ahead of a treaty.

In June 2015, the Government of Gibraltar started issuing electronic identity cards. These are produced by Mühlbauer Holding AG in Germany.

See also
Gibraltar passport
National identity cards in the European Union
Schengen Area#Gibraltar

References

External links
HM Government of Gibraltar: ID cards & Civilian registration cards 
Front side on PRADO 
Reverse side on PRADO

Gibraltar
Society of Gibraltar